The Serpent's Shadow could refer to:
The Serpent's Shadow (Lackey novel), a fantasy novel by Mercedes Lackey
The Serpent's Shadow (Riordan novel), a fantasy novel by Rick Riordan